The Mille River is a river of Ethiopia and a tributary of the Awash. It drains parts of the Semien (North) Wollo and Debub (South) Wollo Zones of the Amhara Region, as well as Administrative Zone 4 of the Afar Region. The explorer L.M. Nesbitt, who travelled through the area in 1928, was impressed by its size, and described the Mille as "probably the only real river which joins the Awash". The Ala River (A'ura) and Golima River (Golina) are small tributaries of the Mille.

The Mille River rises in the Ethiopian highlands west of Sulula in Tehuledere woreda.

See also
List of rivers of Ethiopia

Notes

Rivers of Ethiopia
Awash River
Ethiopian Highlands